I-Divisioona was the second tier of ice hockey in Finland from 1974 to 2000. In the year 2000 I-Divisioona was replaced by Mestis.

Participating teams

External links
Finnish Ice Hockey Federation

 
Ice hockey leagues in Finland
Defunct ice hockey competitions in Finland
Fin